Notoemys is an extinct genus of platychelyid turtle known from the Late Jurassic and Early Cretaceous of the Americas.

Species 

 Notoemys laticentralis Cattoi and Freiburg, 1961 Vaca Muerta, Argentina, Late Jurassic (Tithonian)
 Notoemys oxfordiensis (de la Fuente and Iturralde-Vinent 2001) Jagua Formation, Cuba, Late Jurassic (Oxfordian) (originally Caribemys oxfordiensis)
 Notoemys tlaxiacoensis Lopez-Conde et al. 2017 Sabinal Formation, Mexico, Late Jurassic (Kimmeridgian)
 Notoemys zapatocaensis Cadena, 2005 Rosablanca Formation, Colombia, Early Cretaceous (Valanginian)

References

External links
 A New Pleurodiran Turtle from the  Jagua Formation (Oxfordian) of Western Cuba. The Journal of Paleontology, July 2001.

Late Jurassic turtles
Prehistoric turtle genera
Jurassic reptiles of North America
Turtles of North America
Oxfordian life
Jurassic Cuba
Fossils of Cuba
Fossil taxa described in 2001
Extinct turtles
Jurassic Argentina